Franciscan University of Steubenville is a private Franciscan university in Steubenville, Ohio. The university has 3,656 students as of fall 2022, including 2,602 students on campus, in 40 undergraduate and 8 graduate degree programs. The student body is 97 percent Catholic and the university claims to have the largest number of students majoring in theology, catechetics, and philosophy of any Catholic university in the United States.

The school was established as the College of Steubenville in 1946 by the Franciscan Friars of the Third Order Regular at the request of Bishop Mussio, the first bishop of the Diocese of Steubenville.  In 1974, Fr. Michael Scanlan, T.O.R., became president and began a series of major reforms to restore the school to its Catholic heritage.  The school changed its name to the University of Steubenville upon achieving university status in 1980, and adopted the current title Franciscan University of Steubenville in 1986.

History 
In 1946, the first Bishop of Steubenville, Anthony John King Mussio, invited the Franciscan Friars of the Third Order Regular to establish a Catholic college in the diocese to serve local students and especially World War II veterans. In June 1946, the friars accepted the offer, purchased the Knights of Pythias Building in downtown Steubenville, and invested $350,000 in establishing the College of Steubenville. Enrollment grew, and more buildings were purchased, but the college was still cramped. The friars bought a 40-acre property overlooking the city, and accreditation was provided by the North Central Association of Colleges and Schools in 1960.

The College of Steubenville was successful during the early years, under the tenures of presidents the Rev. Daniel W. Egan, the Rev. Kevin R. Keelan, and the Rev. Columba J. Devlin. By the end of Keelan's second term in 1974, the school was suffering from social upheaval and declining enrollment. For some time, it looked like the college would close. The Rev. Michael Scanlan was chosen to fill the position of president. Incorporating knowledge from his experience in starting a charismatic renewal movement at St. Francis Seminary, Scanlan worked to institute a similar renewal at Steubenville.  He took over the Sunday liturgy on the campus, incorporating charismatic praise and worship and more passionate preaching into the Mass. He instituted households, small groups of men and women devoted to personal and communal growth, and required students to join one. Scanlan also created a renewal center on the campus, which organized retreats and seminars to further instruct students in the Roman Catholic faith. The center began holding religious conferences in the summers, one benefit of which was attracting many young people to the college. Scanlan often spoke at these conferences.

Even with these changes, the college struggled to stay open. The first year after Scanlan instituted the changes, the incoming freshman class was the smallest in the college's history. Five of the top administrators at the college left or were dismissed, and the remaining faculty expressed discontentment with Scanlan's leadership. Despite this, Scanlan continued to make changes, especially to the curriculum. Scanlan reintroduced a theology program, which quickly became the top major at the college, and also oversaw the development of graduate programs in business and theology, which helped the college obtain the title of university in 1980. In addition, the nursing program rose to higher distinction. It was chartered by the state government of Ohio in 1984 and then received accreditation from the National League of Nursing in 1985.

Scanlan orchestrated many other changes at the university. He instituted an Oath of Fidelity to the Magisterium, which was required of the theology professors at the university. Under his guidance, the undergraduate theology program became the largest of any Catholic university in America. He also created the Human Life Studies minor, the only one of its kind in America. By 2000, Scanlan's leadership and changes had helped the university to increase dramatically in size; there were more than 2,100 students, nearly double the number in the early 1970s.

The university was granted an exemption from Title IX in 2014 that allows it to legally discriminate against LGBT students.

In 2022, David Morrier, a Franciscan friar who served as a campus minister until his removal in 2014, was sentenced to probation after being pleading guilty to sexual battery of a student whom he had been counseling, which took place over three years, from 2010 to 2013.

List of presidents and chancellors

Academics
The university offers 41 majors (seven pre-professional programs), 34 minors, 10 special minor programs (not available as majors), and seven graduate degree programs. The university maintains a 14:1 student-faculty ratio. Undergraduate students need a minimum of 124 credits for graduation. The number of electives varies with each major program. The university operates on the semester system. Three summer sessions also are available.

Franciscan University of Steubenville participates in the Advanced Placement (AP) Program, the College Level Examination Program (CLEP), and Internationas.

Rankings
The university was ranked in the top tier in its category (Masters Colleges in the Midwest) in the 2011 U.S. News & World Report's list of America's Best Colleges. In 2013, Young America's Foundation rated Franciscan as one of the top 10 conservative colleges in the nation, three years after the Cardinal Newman Society ranked it as one of the 21 top Catholic colleges and universities in The Newman Guide to Choosing a Catholic College. In 2014, Franciscan was featured for the first time in Forbes's college rankings, receiving a national ranking of 364 out of 4,500 colleges and universities. It placed 266th in private colleges and 87th among Midwest colleges and universities. The school's average SAT score is 1221, and its average ACT score is 25.5.

Special programs

Honors program 
There is also an honors program in the Great Books of Western Civilization. The Honors Program open to qualified undergraduate students of any major.

Priestly Discernment Program 
The Priestly Discernment Program offers human, academic, spiritual, pastoral and fraternal formation for men considering the Catholic priesthood.

Academic partnerships

Engineering dual degree program 
In 2014, Franciscan University introduced a dual-degree undergraduate engineering program, partnering with the University of Notre Dame, Gannon University and University of Dayton to offer an array of different engineering disciplines. Through the dual-degree program, students matriculate into Franciscan's quantitative and liberal arts curriculum for the first two years of undergraduate study and are able to directly transfer into engineering programs at any of the partner schools for an additional two to three years. Upon culmination of the program, the student will obtain a Bachelor of Science or Bachelor of Arts from Franciscan University (contingent on the program and credits elected) and a Bachelor in Science from one of the partner schools.

Franciscan University also offers a "2+2" program in which students can earn an Associate of Science degree in Natural and Applied Science from Franciscan before transferring to another school to complete a Bachelor of Science in engineering.

Doctor of Pharmacy dual degree program 
In 2016, Franciscan University announced an agreement with D'Youville College which created a 3+4 dual degree program between the two schools. Under the current arrangement, undergraduate students may enroll at Franciscan to begin studies in chemistry or biology and, after three years, may transfer directly into a four-year Doctor of Pharmacy program at D'Youville College's School of Pharmacy. Upon completion of the seven-year program, the graduate receives a Bachelor of Science degree from Franciscan and a Doctor of Pharmacy degree from D'Youville.

In 2017, the university entered into a similar articulation agreement with Duquesne University, which grants Franciscan University students preferred admission in the Mylan School of Pharmacy upon completion of an Associate of Arts degree.

3+3 Dual degree law program 
The university maintains a partnership with a number of Catholic law schools which allows undergraduate students to complete three years of undergraduate study in Steubenville, then, pending LSAT scores and other admissions criteria, matriculate directly into a three-year Juris Doctor program at either the Catholic University of America School of Law, University of St. Thomas School of Law, Ave Maria School of Law, or the Duquesne University School of Law.

Canon Law, First Cycle 
In conjunction with the School of Canon Law at the Catholic University of America, Franciscan University offers a course of study that fulfills the requirements for the First Cycle of studies in Canon Law. Graduates of Franciscan University who complete this course of study are allowed to proceed directly to the Licentiate in Canon Law program at the Catholic University of America.

Academic treatment of homosexuality
In 2012 the Social Work curriculum included a course called SWK Deviant Behavior 314, which examined behaviors such as: murder, rape, robbery, prostitution, homosexuality, mental illness and drug use. Noting that the Diagnostic and Statistical Manual of Mental Disorders (DSM) had removed homosexuality as an illness, two Franciscan graduates tried to get the course description changed. In a written statement to NPR, the school said, "Franciscan University follows Catholic Church teaching in regard to homosexuality and treats homosexual persons with 'respect, compassion, and sensitivity' ... while holding homosexual acts as 'intrinsically disordered.' " In an interview with Inside Higher Ed, university vice president Daniel Kempton stated, "that principles of academic freedom apply to the course and that the view that homosexuality is deviant is a legitimate perspective for the course."

Campus

The academic buildings on campus include Egan Hall, Stafford Hall, Saints Cosmas and Damian Hall, and the Saint Joseph Center.

Egan Hall houses classrooms, a theater, television and radio studios, special laboratories for the education and psychology departments, and computer workstations on each floor.

In the newly remodeled Stafford Hall,  there are classrooms, offices, and a simulated clinic for nursing students.

Saints Cosmas and Damian Hall, the main science building, houses biology and chemistry laboratories, classrooms,   the campus' largest lecture hall, and two computer science labs with advanced software for programming.

Starvaggi Hall is the main administrative building on campus housing Admissions, Financial Aid, Career Services, and the registrar.

The St. John Paul II Library's collection includes more than 230,000 books and bound periodicals, and more than 390 current periodicals. The OPAL Catalog and  OhioLINK Network provide access to many research databases and more than 7 million books and journals.

There are 13 residence buildings on campus: Saint Francis Hall, Trinity Hall, Marian Hall, Saint Thomas More Hall, Saint Louis Hall, Saint Elizabeth Hall, Kolbe Hall, Clare Hall, Padua Hall, Saint Bonaventure Hall, Vianney Hall, Saint Junipero Serra Hall, and Scotus Hall. Assisi Heights, a small neighborhood of apartments, is also available for upperclassman and graduate student housing.

Franciscan University of Steubenville has two soccer fields, a rugby field, a baseball field, and a field designated primarily for intramural sports.  In 2007, the university purchased the golf course which borders the main campus from the city of Steubenville for future development. It is currently used by the cross country team for practice.

Christ the King Chapel is the center of the spiritual life of the campus.  There are three Masses every weekday while classes are in session, four Masses on Sundays, vespers on Sunday evening, praise & worship every Tuesday, and confessions held at least four times per week. Weekday Masses are routinely standing room only, while Sunday Masses during the school year require extra chairs to be arranged in the foyer and the Eucharistic chapel.

The Portiuncula chapel, a replica of St. Francis' original chapel, sits on the edge of the main campus. It is home to perpetual adoration (at least two students volunteer to be present and adore the Blessed Sacrament during every hour of the week throughout the fall and spring semesters).  Outside of this chapel are the Tomb of the Unborn Child, which contains the remains of seven aborted fetuses, a Creche, Stations of the Cross, and Marian Grotto. In 2009 the Vatican designated the Portiuncula as a place of pilgrimage where the faithful can obtain a plenary indulgence on five certain days through the year and under certain conditions of prayer and a detachment from sin.

The J.C. Willams Center is the student center, which houses the Tom and Nina Gentile Gallery containing numerous works of art donated to the university.

The Finnegan Fieldhouse is home to a basketball court, two racquetball courts, a weight room, one room for aerobic classes, a cardiovascular room, and the campus health and counseling center, as well as classrooms.

At the far north end of campus is the Steel Cross.  This cross, made of two steel I-beams, is 35 feet tall and visible from afar.

Austrian program
Since 1991, up to 180 students per semester study at the university's program in Gaming, Austria. The campus is located in a renovated fourteenth-century Carthusian monastery, known as the Gaming Charterhouse, in the foothills of the Austrian Alps.

The old monastery serves as a hotel during summer months.

The Austrian Program features a four-day class schedule, Monday through Thursday, so students may spend extended time visiting religious, cultural, and historical sites throughout Europe. The program sponsors trips throughout Europe.

In 2011 Franciscan University launched a summer mini program in Austria. The session lasted from May 21 to June 30, 2011.

Student life
Originally, campus life consisted of fraternities and sororities starting at Franciscans' founding in 1946. Under the leadership of Father Michael Scanlan, households (small groups of men and women devoted to personal and communal growth) were instituted and a once blossoming Greek life began to wilt, ending in 2016 when the final chapters, Theta Phi Alpha and Alpha Phi Delta were excluded from campus life. Though not recognized by the school, Alpha Phi Delta a nationally recognized fraternity, has remained active (as of 2019).

Instead, students are encouraged to join in faith households, groups of three or more students of the same sex, whose members study, recreate, and pray with one another. Typically, these student groups are attached to a particular dormitory on campus and are centered around particular devotions or charismatic gifts. As of March 2015, there were 24 men's households and 26 women's households. In 2014, Franciscan University celebrated 40 years of household life on campus.

The campus is known for its liturgies, retreats, and spiritual talks. Most students make a weekly commitment to Eucharistic adoration in the Portiuncula chapel, and Masses are well-attended. Masses have standing room only, even on weekdays.

There is a 28-member student government.

Athletics

Varsity
The university sponsors 20 sports, nine for men and eleven for women. The athletics teams, nicknamed the Barons, compete in NCAA Division III as members of the Presidents' Athletic Conference (PAC) after completing a transition from the Allegheny Mountain Collegiate Conference in July 2020. The Barons started their PAC transition by joining for men's and women's lacrosse in 2018–19. For 2019–20, Franciscan added women's golf, plus indoor and outdoor track & field for both men and women, to its PAC membership. Finally, the school became a full PAC member in 2020–21.

The mascot of the university's sports teams is Baron von Steuben, modeled after Prussian military officer Baron Friedrich Wilhelm von Steuben.

The men's rugby team is a member of the National Collegiate Rugby and competes in the Allegheny Rugby Union Conference. In 2001 Franciscan became the second college in the nation, of any division, to have a varsity rugby club. In July 2011, Franciscan signed a three-year sponsorship agreement with Adidas.

Men's
 Basketball
 Cross Country
 Lacrosse
 Baseball
 Rugby. The Men's rugby club has made it to the Conference Championship match every year for the past five years, winning three conference titles and qualifying for post-season play three times.  In 2010–2011, they were conference champions and Midwest Territory Runners-up finishing 13th in the nation overall. In 2011–2012, Franciscan Rugby had its most successful season in history when they won their conference as well as the Central regional tournament, going on to compete at the NSCRO National Championship and placing third nationally. In 2012–2013, the team was Conference Champions runners-up.  In 2013–2014, Franciscan won their conference yet again earning a spot in the Central regional tournament finishing third place and earning the tenth position in the NSCRO national rankings. In the fall of 2014 FUS Rugby had a nine-game winning streak and finished with another Conference Championship appearance, taking second place in the conference. In the fall of 2015 FUS Rugby went 5–2 in the regular season and again finished with another Conference Championship appearance, taking second place in the conference, falling to Robert Morris University for the second year in a row. In the fall of 2016, FUS Rugby won their conference with a 6–4 record earning a spot in the Central regional tournament finishing fourth place and earning the tenth position in the NSCRO national rankings for a second time in four years.  In 2019–2020 season, Franciscan Rugby continued its success with the team going undefeated in regular and post-season play with an 11–0 record.  They qualified for NSCRO's National Championship with a #2 ranking, the team's highest ranking since 2011–2012 season.  They had 3 All-Americans named to NSCRO's All-American squad- Josh Leatherby, David Prezzia and PJ Ernst.  However, the COVID pandemic canceled the National Championship.  In the fall of 2021, Franciscan joined a new conference, the ARU Collegiate Conference. They started the season ranked #3 but could not retain the rankings as the season went on. They finished runners-up in the ARU championship and were relgated to the Play-in qualifying match which they won to advance to the Central Regionals.  They lost 34–31 but won the consolidation match to finish 8–4–1 on the year and a final ranking of #13.  
 Soccer
 Tennis. The 2012–2013 Men's tennis team earned entry into the NCAA DIII national tournament, making them first Baron team in any sport to qualify for NCAA postseason play. This was followed by successive trips back to the postseason from 2013 to 2015. The Woman's tennis team also made it to the NCAA DIII National tournament during the 2014–2015 season, making them the first Woman's Baron team to qualify for the NCAA postseason play. Recognizing the strength of tennis program, and also in the spirit of Michael Scanlan who was an avid tennis player, the university hopes to bring a tennis facility to campus in the near future in order to ensure a year-round practice place, and to further solidify the teams recent success. 
 Track & field (indoor). The men's indoor track and field team competes from December through late February, with the season culminating at the Presidents AC Indoor Track and Field Championships. The 2022 season concluded with the team placing 2nd at PAC Championships.
 Track & field (outdoor). The Barons finished off the 2022 outdoor season by placing 5th in the PAC Outdoor Championships.

Women's
 Basketball
 Cross country
 Golf
 Lacrosse
 Soccer
 Softball
 Swimming & Diving
 Tennis
 Track & field (indoor)
 Track & field (outdoor)
 Volleyball

Intramurals
The university offers intramural sports throughout the academic year. The main sports played include sand volleyball, indoor volleyball, flag football, and 5 on 5 basketball. Other leagues throughout the year include kickball, badminton, Spikeball, softball, futsal, and dodgeball.

Notable alumni
Andrew Bremberg – Former Permanent Representative of the United States of America to the Office of the United Nations and Other International Organizations in Geneva
Jeff Cavins – Catholic evangelist, author, and biblical scholar
Regina Doman – Catholic fiction writer
Jason Evert – Founder of the Chastity Project, Totus Tuus Press, and prominent chastity speaker
Jeff Fortenberry – Politician, economist, and convicted felon who served in the United States House of Representatives from 2005 to 2022, representing 
Roger Joseph Foys – Bishop of Covington, Kentucky
Michael Gielen – Auxiliary bishop of Auckland, New Zealand
Gintaras Grušas –  Archbishop of Vilnius, Lithuania
Jonathan Morris – Contributor and analyst for the Fox News Channel
Michael Rodak, Jr. – Clerk of the Supreme Court of the United States
Cornelius Sim – Cardinal and bishop of Brunei
Anna Song – California politician

References

External links
Official website
Official athletics website
The Troubadour (Franciscan's newspaper)

 
Franciscan universities and colleges
Buildings and structures in Jefferson County, Ohio
Catholic universities and colleges in Ohio
Roman Catholic Diocese of Steubenville
Education in Jefferson County, Ohio
Educational institutions established in 1946
1946 establishments in Ohio
Association of Catholic Colleges and Universities